Dwane Husbands (born 24 July 1985) is a Barbadian singer who is best known for being featured on the Rihanna song Dem Haters, thus appearing on her 2006 second album "A Girl like Me".

Husbands has performed in several national awards and competitions, and is claimed to have released two singles. He cites Bob Marley, John Legend and Alicia Keys as his influences, and has previously worked as a janitor prior to his break in music industry.

References

External links
 Dwane Husbands on Myspace
 

1985 births
Living people
Barbadian pop singers
Barbadian male singers
Janitors